Júlio César de Freitas Filho (born 21 March 1995), known as Júlio César, is a Brazilian professional footballer who plays for Al-Fahaheel as a defender.

Professional career
Júlio César made his professional debut with Vila Nova in a 1-0 Campeonato Brasileiro Série B loss to Ponte Preta on 21 May 2014.

References

External links
Futebol de Goyaz profile 

1995 births
Living people
People from Anápolis
Brazilian footballers
Association football defenders
Primeira Liga players
Liga Portugal 2 players
Campeonato Brasileiro Série B players
C.D. Nacional players
Anápolis Futebol Clube players
CE Operário Várzea-Grandense players
Goiás Esporte Clube players
Vila Nova Futebol Clube players
Brazilian expatriate footballers
Brazilian expatriate sportspeople in Portugal
Expatriate footballers in Portugal
Sportspeople from Goiás
Brazilian expatriate sportspeople in Kuwait
Kuwait Premier League players
Expatriate footballers in Kuwait
Al-Fahaheel FC players